New York's 141st State Assembly district is one of the 150 districts in the New York State Assembly. It has been represented by Assembly Majority Leader Crystal Peoples-Stokes since 2003.

Geography
District 141 is entirely within Erie County. It contains central and northeastern Buffalo.

Recent election results

2022

2020

2018

2016

2014

2012

References

141
Erie County, New York